Matthew Peter Horwich (born October 2, 1978) is an American mixed martial artist who most recently competed in the Middleweight division. A professional competitor since 2003, Horwich has fought in BAMMA, Strikeforce, Bellator, the UFC, and for the Seattle Tiger Sharks of the IFL where he was the IFL Middleweight Champion.

Background

Horwich was born and raised in Seattle, Washington. He watched many Bruce Lee films growing up and entered Dojo Kai Korean traditional martial arts classes. Growing up, Horwich had little interest in school due to low opinions of his teachers. Unmotivated, lost and without a concrete path to embark on, he began to experiment with drugs and alcohol. He then garnered interest for Brazilian Jiu-Jitsu (BJJ) at the age of 17 and saved up enough money to learn from none other than Royce Gracie himself. After that, he reluctantly made an unwise decision and was placed in jail for thirty days for fighting and breaking windows. He served his time and chose to relocate to Seattle, Washington with the intention of starting a band. While there, he performed odd jobs and lived in squats as he crossed-paths between becoming either a musician or martial artist. He then eventually experienced a religious conversion as a self-described "spiritual" Christian and rededicated himself to a successful, focused career in martial arts.

Mixed martial arts career

Early career
Horwich developed his impressive skills as a submission specialist training with Team Quest as well as BJJ black belts B.J. Penn and Eddie Bravo. He has also trained extensively with accomplished Kickboxer and Muay Thai Fighter Chris Reilly. Matt Horwich earned the nickname "The Fighting Hippy" due to his extremely unusual personality and interests.

Before signing with the International Fight League's Portland Wolfpack, Matt Horwich amassed a strong record of 15-6-1 fighting in small promotions. It was there that he rose to prominence, when a 5-3 record earned him an opportunity to face Benji Radach in the World Grand Prix Finals to determine the first middleweight champion. Horwich defeated the noted striker by knockout in the second round, becoming the IFL's first ever middleweight champion.

Matt Horwich then signed with the UFC after the IFL folded and made his debut at UFC 90. His opponent, none other than the latest IFL middleweight champion Dan Miller. Horwich came close to sinking in a fight-ending choke in this exciting bout as the clock suspensefully ticked at the final part of the second round. Despite his wholehearted efforts, Miller controlled most of the first and third rounds and took the unanimous decision. Horwich then made his second UFC appearance at UFC Fight Night: Condit vs. Kampmann against Ricardo Almeida which resulted in a second decision loss and his release from the company.

After that, he debuted with Bellator and then Aggression MMA where he came back with a solid, split-decision victory over Jason Lambert. This very well-fought rematch took place in Alberta, Canada as Horwich successfully returned to his winning ways.

Horwich fought Tom 'Kong' Watson at BAMMA3 as a late replacement for Alex Reid on May 15, 2010, and lost. It was his first fight in Britain.

Horwich beat Thales Leites, former UFC Middleweight contender, in an upset on August 14.

On September 9, 2010, Horwich fought Bellator season two semifinalist Eric Schambari, losing via split decision.

Horwich then defeated Jake Rosholt by technical knockout in the third round at Xtreme Fight Night – Rosholt vs. Horwich in November 2010.

At Shark Fights 14: Horwich vs. Villefort on March 11, 2011, Horwich squared off with UFC and WEC veteran Danillo Villefort, losing by unanimous decision after being controlled both on the feet and the floor for the entirety of the 15-minute affair.

Horwich faced a rematch with Jake Rosholt at Shark Fights 17: Horwich vs. Rosholt 2 on July 15, 2011, losing by unanimous decision. Rosholt used his wrestling to neutralize any attempt at a takedown and utilized a much improved striking game to win the nod from the judges.

Horwich fought Piotr Strus at KSW 25 on December 7, 2013. Though the fan favorite coming into the fight, Horwich lost by majority decision.

Personal life
Matt Horwich was married the day after his first attempted defense of the IFL Middleweight Championship. Horwich is often described as a hippie who frequently quotes Bible passages and personal aphorisms in conversation. His hobbies include playing guitar and writing music and poetry, mostly themed around his interest in quantum mechanics. Also knows the difference between a 301 EZO and a 307 SR end.

In September 2022, Matt was featured in underground mini-comic issue #12 "MULTIVERSE" by Spencer Wile.

https://upload.wikimedia.org/wikipedia/commons/5/5a/Matt_Horwich.jpg

Mixed martial arts record

|-
| Win
| align=center| 30–25–1
| Piotr Siwkowski
| TKO (elbows)
| PLMMA 73: Ciechanow
| 
| align=center| 1
| align=center| 1:20
| Ciechanow, Poland
|
|-
| Win
| align=center| 29–25–1
| David Ramirez
| Submission (rear-naked choke)
| PLMMA 72: Lomianki
| 
| align=center| 2
| align=center| N/A
| Lomianki, Poland
|
|-
| Loss
| align=center| 28–25–1
| Marcin Naruszczka
| Decision (unanimous)
| PLMMA 70: Championships
| 
| align=center| 5
| align=center| 5:00
| Warsaw, Poland
|
|-
| Loss
| align=center| 28–24–1
| Vyacheslav Vasilevsky
| Decision (unanimous)
| Fightspirit Championship 6: Horwich vs. Vasilevsky
| 
| align=center| 3
| align=center| 5:00
| St. Petersburg, Russia
|
|-
| Loss
| align=center| 28–23–1
| Jae Young Kim
| KO (punch)
| Top FC 9: Battle of Incheon
| 
| align=center| 1
| align=center| 0:31
| Incheon, South Korea
| 
|-
| Loss
| align=center| 28–22–1
| Piotr Strus
| Decision (majority)
| KSW 25: Khalidov vs. Sakurai
| 
| align=center| 3
| align=center| 5:00
| Wroclaw, Poland
| 
|-
| Win
| align=center| 28–21–1
| Terry Martin
| TKO (punches)
| KSW 21
| 
| align=center| 2
| align=center| 4:08
| Warsaw, Poland
|Catchweight bout of 191 lbs.
|-
| Win
| align=center| 27–21–1
| Antoni Chmielewski
| TKO (punches)
| KSW XIX
| 
| align=center| 3
| align=center| 2:19
| Lódz, Poland
| 
|-
| Loss
| align=center| 26–21–1
| Thales Leites
| Submission (arm-triangle choke)
| Amazon Forest Combat 2
| 
| align=center| 2
| align=center| 4:39
| Manaus, Amazonas, Brazil
|Catchweight bout of 194 lbs.
|-
| Loss
| align=center| 26–20–1
| Michał Materla
| Decision (unanimous)
| KSW 17: Revenge
| 
| align=center| 3
| align=center| 3:00
| Lódz, Poland
| |
|-
| Loss
| align=center| 26–19–1
| Jake Rosholt
| Decision (unanimous)
| Shark Fights 17: Horwich vs. Rosholt 2
| 
| align=center| 3
| align=center| 5:00
| Frisco, Texas, United States
| 
|-
| Loss
| align=center| 26–18–1
| Danillo Villefort
| Decision (unanimous)
| Shark Fights 14: Horwich vs. Villefort
| 
| align=center| 3
| align=center| 5:00
| Lubbock, Texas, United States
| 
|-
| Win
| align=center| 26–17–1
| Jake Rosholt
| TKO (punches)
| Xtreme Fight Night: Rosholt vs. Horwich 
| 
| align=center| 3
| align=center| 2:56
| Tulsa, Oklahoma, United States
| 
|-
| Loss
| align=center| 25–17–1
| Eric Schambari
| Decision (split)
| Bellator 28
| 
| align=center| 3
| align=center| 5:00
| New Orleans, Louisiana, United States
| 
|-
| Win
| align=center| 25–16–1
| Thales Leites
| Submission (rear-naked choke)
| Powerhouse World Promotions: War on the Mainland
| 
| align=center| 4
| align=center| 0:44
| Irvine, California, United States
| 
|-
| Loss
| align=center| 24–16–1
| Tom Watson
| Decision (unanimous)
| BAMMA 3
| 
| align=center| 5
| align=center| 5:00
| Birmingham, England
| 
|-
| Loss
| align=center| 24–15–1
| Jason MacDonald
| Decision (unanimous)
| LGIO MMA 1: MacDonald vs Horwich
| 
| align=center| 3
| align=center| 5:00
| Edmonton, Alberta, Canada
| 
|-
| Win
| align=center| 24–14–1
| Jason Lambert
| Decision (split)
| AMMA 1: First Blood
| 
| align=center| 3
| align=center| 5:00
| Edmonton, Alberta, Canada
| 
|-
| Loss
| align=center| 23–14–1
| Bryan Baker
| Decision (unanimous)
| Bellator 10
| 
| align=center| 3
| align=center| 5:00
| Ontario, California, United States
| 
|-
| Loss
| align=center| 23–13–1
| Ricardo Almeida
| Decision (unanimous)
| UFC Fight Night: Condit vs. Kampmann
| 
| align=center| 3
| align=center| 5:00
| Nashville, Tennessee, United States
| 
|-
| Loss
| align=center| 23–12–1
| Dan Miller
| Decision (unanimous)
| UFC 90
| 
| align=center| 3
| align=center| 5:00
| Rosemont, Illinois, United States
| 
|-
| Win
| align=center| 23–11–1
| Joey Guel
| Decision (unanimous)
| IFL: Mohegan Sun
| 
| align=center| 3
| align=center| 4:00
| Uncasville, Connecticut, United States
| 
|-
| Loss
| align=center| 22–11–1
| Ryan McGivern
| Decision(unanimous)
| IFL: Vegas
| 
| align=center| 5
| align=center| 4:00
| Las Vegas, Nevada, United States
| 
|-
| Win
| align=center| 22–10–1
| Benji Radach
| KO (punch)
| IFL: World Grand Prix Finals
| 
| align=center| 2
| align=center| 1:58
| Uncasville, Connecticut, United States
| 
|-
| Win
| align=center| 21–10–1
| Brian Foster
| Submission (armbar)
| IFL: World Grand Prix Semifinals
| 
| align=center| 1
| align=center| 3:59
| Chicago, Illinois, United States
|Catchweight bout of 188 lbs.
|-
| Win
| align=center| 20–10–1
| Kazuhiro Hamanaka
| KO (head kick)
| IFL: Everett
| 
| align=center| 1
| align=center| 2:07
| Everett, Washington, United States
| 
|-
| Loss
| align=center| 19–10–1
| Jamal Patterson
| Submission (guillotine choke)
| IFL: Connecticut
| 
| align=center| 1
| align=center| 0:37
| Uncasville, Connecticut, United States
| 
|-
| Win
| align=center| 19–9–1
| Brent Beauparlant
| Submission (kimura)
| IFL: Atlanta
| 
| align=center| 2
| align=center| 0:28
| Atlanta, Georgia, United States
| 
|-
| Loss
| align=center| 18–9–1
| Ryan McGivern
| Decision (unanimous)
| IFL: Championship Final
| 
| align=center| 3
| align=center| 4:00
| Uncasville, Connecticut, United States
| 
|-
| Win
| align=center| 18–8–1
| Mike Pyle
| Submission (rear-naked choke)
| IFL: World Championship Semifinals
| 
| align=center| 2
| align=center| 1:02
| Portland, Oregon, United States
| 
|-
| Win
| align=center| 17–8–1
| Bristol Marunde
| Decision (unanimous)
| IFL: Portland
| 
| align=center| 3
| align=center| 4:00
| Portland, Oregon, United States
| 
|-
| Loss
| align=center| 16–8–1
| Jamal Patterson
| Submission (rear-naked choke)
| IFL: Legends Championship 2006
| 
| align=center| 1
| align=center| 2:57
| Atlantic City, New Jersey, United States
| 
|-
| Loss
| align=center| 16–7–1
| Roan Carneiro
| Decision (split)
| WCFC: No Guts No Glory
| 
| align=center| 3
| align=center| 5:00
| Manchester, England
|
|-
| Win
| align=center| 16–6–1
| Petras Markevicius
| Submission (rear naked choke)
| WCFC: No Guts No Glory
| 
| align=center| 1
| align=center| 4:59
| Manchester, England
| 
|-
| Loss
| align=center| 15–6–1
| Brian Ebersole
| Decision (unanimous)
| Strikeforce: Shamrock vs. Gracie
| 
| align=center| 3
| align=center| 5:00
| San Jose, California, United States
|
|-
| Win
| align=center| 15–5–1
| Rob Wince
| Submission (armbar)
| ACF: Genesis
| 
| align=center| 1
| align=center| 1:46
| Denver, Colorado, United States
| 
|-
| Win
| align=center| 14–5–1
| John Cronk
| Submission (rear naked choke)
| SF 13: Rocky Mountain Sportfight
| 
| align=center| 2
| align=center| 3:28
| Denver, Colorado, United States
| 
|-
| Win
| align=center| 13–5–1
| Vernon White
| Submission (rear-naked choke)
| SF 12: Breakout
| 
| align=center| 2
| align=center| 2:38
| Portland, Oregon, United States
| 
|-
| Win
| align=center| 12–5–1
| Krzysztof Soszynski
| Submission (rear-naked choke)
| Freedom Fight: Canada vs USA
| 
| align=center| 2
| align=center| 0:52
| Hull, Quebec, Canada
| 
|-
| Loss
| align=center| 11-5-1
| Travis Wiuff
| Decision (unanimous)
| Extreme Challenge 62
| 
| align=center| 3
| align=center| 5:00
| Medina, Minnesota, United States
| 
|-
| Win
| align=center| 11–4–1
| Brian Wieber
| Submission (rear-naked choke)
| XFC: Dome of Destruction 2
| 
| align=center| 1
| align=center| 2:37
| Tacoma, Washington, United States
| 
|-
| Loss
| align=center| 10–4–1
| Trevor Prangley
| Decision (unanimous)
| SF 9: Respect
| 
| align=center| 3
| align=center| 5:00
| Gresham, Oregon, United States
| 
|-
| Win
| align=center| 10–3–1
| Chris Kiever
| Submission (triangle choke)
| Kickdown Classic 16
| 
| align=center| 2
| align=center| 0:40
| Denver, Colorado, United States
| 
|-
| Loss
| align=center| 9–3–1
| Jason Lambert
| TKO (submission to punches)
| WEC 12
| 
| align=center| 2
| align=center| 3:28
| Lemoore, California, United States
| 
|-
| Win
| align=center| 9–2–1
| Jason MacDonald
| Submission (armbar)
| Extreme Fighting Challenge 3
| 
| align=center| 1
| align=center| N/A
| Prince George, British Columbia, Canada
| 
|-
| Win
| align=center| 8–2–1
| Billy Miles
| Submission (rear-naked choke)
| SF 6: Battleground in Reno
| 
| align=center| 2
| align=center| 0:59
| Reno, Nevada, United States
| 
|-
| Win
| align=center| 7–2–1
| Antony Rea
| Submission (rear-naked choke)
| APEX: Genesis
| 
| align=center| 2
| align=center| 1:13
| Montreal, Quebec, Canada
| 
|-
| Win
| align=center| 6–2–1
| Paul Purcell
| Submission (rear-naked choke)
| SF 5: Stadium
| 
| align=center| 1
| align=center| N/A
| Gresham, Oregon, United States
| 
|-
| Win
| align=center| 5–2–1
| Mikko Rupponen
| Submission (triangle choke)
| PFA: Pride and Fury
| 
| align=center| 3
| align=center| 0:50
| Worley, Idaho, United States
| 
|-
| Win
| align=center| 4–2–1
| Chris Kiever
| Submission (triangle choke)
| Cage Fighting Championship 1
| 
| align=center| 1
| align=center| 1:47
| Salt Lake City, Utah, United States
| 
|-
| Loss
| align=center| 3–2–1
| Glover Teixeira
| Decision (unanimous)
| SF 3: Dome
| 
| align=center| 3
| align=center| 5:00
| Gresham, Oregon, United States
| 
|-
| Win
| align=center| 3–1–1
| Horace Spencer
| Submission (rear-naked choke)
| SF 2: On the Move
| 
| align=center| 1
| align=center| 4:45
| Portland, Oregon, United States
| 
|-
| Win
| align=center| 2–1–1
| Joshua Burkman
| Submission (triangle choke)
| SF 1: Revolution
| 
| align=center| 2
| align=center| 2:11
| Portland, Oregon, United States
| 
|-
| Loss
| align=center| 1–1–1
| Rich Guerin
| Submission (armbar)
| DesertBrawl 9
| 
| align=center| 1
| align=center| 1:54
| Bend, Oregon, United States
| 
|-
| Draw
| align=center| 1–0–1
| Shane Davis
| Draw
| Ultimate Ring Challenge 6
| 
| align=center| 3
| align=center| 3:00
| Longview, Washington, United States
| 
|-
| Win
| align=center| 1–0
| Cory Devela
| Submission (rear-naked choke)
| PPKA: Ultimate Fight Night 2	
| 
| align=center| 2
| align=center| 1:24
| Pasco, Washington, United States
|

References

External links
 
 

Living people
1978 births
American male mixed martial artists
Mixed martial artists from California
Mixed martial artists from Oregon
Middleweight mixed martial artists
Mixed martial artists utilizing Brazilian jiu-jitsu
American practitioners of Brazilian jiu-jitsu
Sportspeople from Portland, Oregon
Ultimate Fighting Championship male fighters